Strauss is a common Germanic surname.

Strauss or Straus may also refer to:

Companies 
 Strauss Group, food manufacturer in Israel
 Straus Family Creamery, a California organic dairy in Marin County
 Abraham & Straus, former major New York City department store co-founded by Isidor and Nathan Straus
 Farrar, Straus and Giroux, American book-publishing company
 Karl Strauss Brewing Company, a San Diego, California-based beer business with a microbrewery and a chain of brewpub restaurants, co-founded by Karl Strauss
 Levi Strauss & Co., clothiers
 Strauss Bascule Bridge Company of Chicago, an engineering firm founded by Joseph Strauss, chief engineer of the Golden Gate Bridge
 Straus Clothing, a North Dakota menswear retailer
 Engelbert Strauss, a German clothing company

Buildings 
 Straus Hall, dormitory housing first-year students at Harvard College named after Isidor Straus and Ida Straus
 Straus Education Building, at the University of Louisiana at Monroe
 Robert S. Strauss Center for International Security and Law, or Strauss Center, at the University of Texas at Austin

Places and geographic features
 Strauss Airfield, a World War II airfield near Noonamah, Northern Territory, Australia
 Strauss Glacier, in Marie Byrd Land, West Antarctica
 Straus Park, a small landscaped park on the Upper West Side of Manhattan
 Straus Street, a north–south road in north-central Jerusalem
 Straussee, a lake in Strausberg, Brandenburg, Germany, occasionally translated as "Lake Straus"

Other uses 
 22647 Lévi-Strauss, a main-belt minor planet
 Bobbs-Merrill Co. v. Straus, United States Supreme Court decision concerning the scope of rights accorded owners of a copyright
 Straus flask, a type of Schlenk flask used in air sensitive chemistry
 Strauss–Howe generational theory, created by authors William Strauss and Neil Howe, identifies a recurring generational cycle in American history
 USS Straus (DE-408), a John C. Butler-class destroyer escort of the United States Navy
 USS Joseph Strauss (DDG-16), a Charles F. Adams-class guided missile armed destroyer of the United States Navy

See also 
 Strausse, a type of wine tavern in winegrowing areas of German-speaking countries that is only open during certain times of the year